Palakrishnan Madhavan (1 January 1928 – 6 December 2003) was an Indian film director and producer in Tamil cinema in the 1960s and 1970s. Madhavan has directed 49 films and produced 39 films under the banner Arun Prasad Movies.

Career 
Madhavan who came to Chennai to become an actor started his career as an assistant to director T. R. Ragunath. He also worked as an associate director to C. V. Sridhar before becoming a full-fledged director making his debut with Mani Osai which failed at box-office. His notable films include Dheiva Thaai, Vietnam Veedu, Thanga Pathakkam, Kanne Pappa, and Kuzhanthaikkaga. He was also the first chairman and managing director of the M.G.R Film City and the State Film Development Corporation. He has also served as a chairman of the National Film Awards.

Awards 
 1970 – Raman Ethanai Ramanadi – National Film Award for Best Feature Film in Tamil
 1972 – Pattikada Pattanama – National Film Award for Best Feature Film in Tamil
1970 – Nilave Nee Satchi – Tamil Nadu State Film Award for Best Director

Partial filmography

Death 
He died on 16 December 2003 at the age of 75 in Chennai.

References

External links 
 

Film directors from Chennai
Tamil film directors
Tamil Nadu State Film Awards winners
Filmfare Awards South winners
2003 deaths
Place of birth missing
20th-century Indian film directors
1928 births
Film producers from Chennai
Tamil film producers